Tang Hui-wen (born 26 November 1972) is a Taiwanese taekwondo practitioner. 

She won a gold medal in bantamweight at the 1993 World Taekwondo Championships in New York City, defeating Won Sun-jin in the semifinal and Elisabet Delgado in the final. She won a gold medal at the 1996 Asian Taekwondo Championships, and a gold medal at the 1998 Asian Games.

References

External links

1972 births
Living people
Taiwanese female taekwondo practitioners
Taekwondo practitioners at the 1998 Asian Games
Asian Games medalists in taekwondo
Medalists at the 1998 Asian Games
Asian Games gold medalists for Chinese Taipei
World Taekwondo Championships medalists
Asian Taekwondo Championships medalists
20th-century Taiwanese women